Pons is a commune in the Charente-Maritime department in southwestern France. The city is known for its numerous national historic monuments dating from the 12th century on wards. One of the most well known is the 33 meter high Keep of Pons the which is the official symbol of the city.

Geography
The Seugne flows north through the middle of the commune and crosses the town.

Population

Gallery

See also
Communes of the Charente-Maritime department

References

External links

 Official website for the city of Pons (French)

Communes of Charente-Maritime
World Heritage Sites in France
Santones
Charente-Maritime communes articles needing translation from French Wikipedia
County of Saintonge